Guido Grandi (3 March 1886 Vigevano, – 10 December 1970, Bologna) was an Italian entomologist.
In 1928 he founded the Institute of Entomology at the University of Bologna (l'Istituto di Entomologia dell'Università di Bologna).

Works

"Introduzione allo studio dell'Entomologia" (1951),2300 pages.
"Studi di un Entomologo sugli Imenotteri superiori" (1961), 650 pages
"Istituzioni di Entomologia generale" (1966), 700 pages

Italian entomologists
1886 births
1970 deaths
20th-century Italian zoologists